Jacob Slichter (born Jacob Huber Slichter, April 5, 1961) is an American musician. He is best known for being the drummer for the rock band Semisonic.

Early life 

Slichter, the son of physicist Charles Slichter, was born in Boston, Massachusetts.  He graduated from Harvard with a degree in African American studies and history. He is the drummer for the Minneapolis based rock band, Semisonic.

Career 

Slichter, in 2004, wrote So You Wanna Be a Rock & Roll Star, a book that details his experiences as a member of Semisonic and their journey through the recording industry.  Kirkus Reviews wrote that "few first-person memoirs of the rock biz are as smart, honest, and entertaining as this tart, incisive work."

In 2006 Slichter said that payola was how his band Semisonic turned their song "Closing Time" into a hit. Slichter stated: "It cost something close to $700,000 to $800,000 to get 'Closing Time' on the air."

References

External links
Jacob by Jacob homepage
NPR: Drummer's Book Takes Shine off Rock-Star Life
Finding His Way: Jacob Slichter of Semisonic (Part I), An Interview by Richard Fulco, Construction Magazine, June 7, 2012
Finding His Way: Jacob Slichter of Semisonic (Part II), An Interview by Richard Fulco, Construction Magazine, June 14, 2012
"Jacob Slichter"

1961 births
Living people
American rock drummers
Harvard University alumni
Musicians from Minneapolis
Writers from Minnesota
Writers from Minneapolis
American male writers
Semisonic members
20th-century American drummers
American male drummers
20th-century American male musicians